Leo Lentelli (20 October 1879 – 31 December 1961) was an Italian sculptor who immigrated to the United States. During his 52 years in the United States he created works throughout the country, notably in New York and San Francisco. He also taught sculpture.

History 
 
Born in Bologna, Italy, on October 29, 1879, Leo Lentelli studied in Bologna and Rome and worked as a sculptor in his native land. Immigrating to the United States in 1903 at the age of 24, Lentelli initially assisted in the studios of several established sculptors. In 1911 he entered the Architectural League exhibition and won the Avery Prize. The following year he became a naturalized citizen of the United States. Chosen to provide sculptural ornament for the Panama-Pacific Exposition, Lentelli moved to San Francisco in 1914. He collaborated with Frederick George Richard Roth and Stirling Calder. Calder has been credited with aiding Lentelli in developing his own style. An example can be seen in his Water Sprites.
His long-limbed figures with hair and draperies in loose frills like seaweed made striking fountain statues and lent themselves well to architectural decoration. The surfaces were left rough for the sake of variety of texture and to give an effect of spontaneity. He also participated as a sculptor in the city's artistic renewal, which took place after the 1906 earthquake and fire. While in San Francisco he taught at the California School of Fine Arts. Significant works from this period include the Five Symbolic Figures at the Old Main Library elevated above the street entrance of the Larkin Street entrance. Still a resident of San Francisco, he made the ornament for the Orpheum Theater, then known as the Historic American Theater, at Saint Louis and created two-figure groups depicting pioneers on the Dennis Sullivan Gateway at Denver, Colorado.

Returning to New York City, he began teaching at the Art Students League. He also taught at the Cooper Union and became an academician of the National Academy of Design. Lentelli gained fame through his The Savior with Sixteen Angels for the reredos at the Cathedral of St. John the Divine in New York, as well as his public sculpture for the Panama-Pacific Exposition in San Francisco. Among his important works are an equestrian statue of Robert E. Lee in Charlottesville, Virginia (collaboration with Henry Shrady), and a 1932 monument to Cardinal Gibbons located north of Meridian Hill Park in Washington, D.C. A benignity is achieved in the latter, its decorative element accented in the carved chair and graceful folds of the cassock. During the New Deal Lentelli created four statues for the Post Office in Oyster Bay, Long Island, dated 1937: a terracotta bust of Theodore Roosevelt, two terracotta panels and ornamentation at the base of the flagpole. During the same period, he also created sculpture for the post office of North East, Pennsylvania. His statue of Apollo and a musical muse, located in a lunette of Steinway Hall on 57th Street in New York City, was covered when the building was sold, but is again on display. Other ornamental figures include Bagnante, a Diana, and Leda. In addition to figures, Lentelli sculpted panels and bas-reliefs for many distinguished buildings. He ornamented a frieze on the Free Academy building at Corning, New York with a panel of children's figures. Lentelli's bas-reliefs on the International Building at Rockefeller Center are considered among his most important works.

Among Leo Lentelli's marks of recognition are the 1922 Medal of Honor of the Architectural League of New York and Gold Medal at the National Academy of Design exhibition in 1927. He was a fellow of the National Sculpture Society, an associate member of the National Academy of Design and a member of the Architectural League of New York. In 1955 Lentelli retired to Italy and died on December 31, 1961, in Rome.

Other works 

Though best known for his work at Rockefeller Center in New York City, he created sculpture which can be seen at a number of other locations, including the following:

 Brookgreen Gardens, South Carolina
 United States Department of Justice, Washington, DC
 U.S. General Service Administration, Washington, DC
 Oakland Museum, Oakland, California
 The Archer, San Francisco Museum of Art
 Pennsylvania Academy of Design
 Cathedral Church of Christ the King, Kalamazoo, Michigan
 Liberty Building, Buffalo, New York (the twin statues of liberty facing east and west atop the roof)
 The Breakers, Palm Beach, Florida

Images 
(click images to enlarge)

Notes

External links 

 Views of Lentelli's bronze statue of Cardinal Gibbons
 Description of Statue of Purity in progress by Leo Lentelli, location Times Square, NY, NY
 Alfred Eisentadt's 1939 photo of Lentelli's American Beauties, World's Fair, New York, NY

Modern sculptors
Art Students League of New York faculty
1879 births
1961 deaths
San Francisco Art Institute faculty
American architectural sculptors
American male sculptors
Italian emigrants to the United States
20th-century American sculptors
20th-century American male artists
Treasury Relief Art Project artists
National Sculpture Society members
Sculptors from New York (state)